The Nepeidae are a family of trilobites, that lived during the late Middle Cambrian - earliest Upper Cambrian in what are today Australia, Antarctica, China and New Zealand. The Nepeidae can be recognized by a vaulted area between the front of the glabella and the frontal border, eye ridges that extend outward and slightly forward from the front of the glabella, and fixed cheeks that cut into the free cheeks at the inside of the eye, and that extend backwards, forming the inner base of the genal spines. The genal spines, however, are part of the free cheeks and extend backward at least half the length of the thorax. The thorax has at least 20 segments. The tail shield (or pygidium) is small.

References 

Ptychoparioidea
Trilobite families
Cambrian trilobites
Drumian
Guzhangian
Miaolingian first appearances
Miaolingian extinctions